East is a province in Guinea-Bissau.  It consists of Bafatá and Gabu regions.

References 

Regions of Guinea-Bissau